Carmen Torres may refer to:

 Carmen Torres (Sunset Beach), a character on Sunset Beach
 Carmen Torres (athlete) (born 1948), Filipino sprinter
 Carmen Marina Torres (1956–2015), Colombian actress